Barbara Andolina (born 16 October 1978) is an Italian judoka.

Achievements

References
 

1978 births
Living people
Italian female judoka
Judoka at the 2004 Summer Olympics
Olympic judoka of Italy
Mediterranean Games bronze medalists for Italy
Mediterranean Games medalists in judo
Competitors at the 2005 Mediterranean Games
20th-century Italian women
21st-century Italian women